Sing-song girls, also known as flower girls, is an English term for the courtesans in China during the 19th century AD.

Origin
Before the founding of modern China in 1911, concubinage was legal. In Chinese custom, males carry the family name and the family's heritage after marriage. To ensure male heirs were produced, it was a common practice for an upper-class married male to have one or more concubines, provided he could support them.

The custom could be invoked without the wife's consent: the husband's actions were protected by law. Concubines would co-exist in the family along with wives and children. A man might choose a courtesan to be his concubine. Many of these courtesans would sing songs to attract potential husbands, hoping to become secondary wives.

Terminology
Western observers in China during the nineteenth century witnessed these women singing but had no idea what to call them since they were not classified as prostitutes. Thus the term "Sing-Song Girls" came about.

There is another theory of the source of the term. According to the 1892 fictional masterpiece by Han Bangqing called Sing-Song Girls of Shanghai (later adapted into the 1998 film Flowers of Shanghai), people in Shanghai called the women who performed in sing-song houses  in the Wu language. The term was pronounced like "sing-song" in English and the young women always sang to entertain the customers; thus Westerners called them Sing-Song girls. The word sian sang in this case is a polite term used to refer to an entertainer.

Their lives
Sing-song girls were trained from childhood to entertain wealthy male clients through companionship, singing and dancing in special sing-song houses. Not all performed sexual services, but many did. They generally saw themselves as lovers and not prostitutes. Sing-song girls did not have distinctive costumes or make-up. Often they wore Shanghai cheongsam as upper-class Chinese women did. Sing-song girls often performed amateur versions of Chinese opera for clients and often wore the traditional Chinese opera costume for small group performance. The girls had one or several male sponsors who might or might not be married and relied on these sponsors to pay off family or personal debts or to sustain their high standard of living. Many sing-song girls married their sponsors to start a free life.

Classes
Among sing-song girls were actually several subclasses of performers divided by the quality of skill. Over time, these would evolve, beginning with one class, developing into four, and consolidating down to two before becoming obsolete during the Cultural Revolution. 
 Shuyu – Highest class were the Shuyu (storytellers), who traced their professional roots back to ancient imperial entertainers. These were skilled in cultured entertainments such as singing, playing instruments, writing poetry, and performing opera. Additionally, these were picked for beauty, trained in sophisticated conversation, and known for their extravagant dress. They were not known for their sexual services so much as for their artistry. Given time, the Shuyu class of entertainer would become assimilated into the Changsan class of prostitutes as a result of their reluctance towards offering sexual services.
 Changsan – The Changsan ("long three") were the highest class of prostitutes. The term originally came from them charging three yuan for company and three more to spend the night. They maintained the class and artistry akin to the Shuyu, while still being distinctly part of the sex trade. For instance, their intimate company would require an elaborate period of courtship. Still, however, such relations were neither permanent nor monogamous.
 Yao'er – The Yao'er ("one two") was the lower tier equivalent of the Changsan. It was named this way because they traditionally charged one yuan for entertainment and two for company. Originally there was an intermediary class called the Ersan ("two three") however, over times these became considered the same class as the Changsan. While Yao'er prostitutes were lower tier than Changsan, they still focused on entertainment as well as sexual services. However, they charged less than the Changsan, and accordingly their beauty, singing, and performances were not as good.

Classes of other sex workers
Below these, fell those whose services were purely sexual. Where some sing-song girls worked as such by choice, the women serving in the lowest tiers of the sex trade were often there as a result of being sold, mortgaged, kidnapped, or otherwise forced into the industry. (These do not address the women in other industries, such as masseuses and taxi dancers, who part-time sold sexual services.)
 "Salt pork" – These prostitutes were housed in brothels which focused entirely on selling sexual services. These houses were colloquially named "salt pork shops" for the similarities between the selling of these women's bodies and of the division and selling of salt pork. Unlike the sing-song girls, these women had almost no say regarding their lives and services, as rather than performing, they were simply having their bodies rented.
 "Pheasants" – The next class of prostitutes were streetwalkers. Being in the streets, they had little protection from law enforcement and thugs, leaving them doubly at risk of arrest or assault. An example of this can be found in the 1934 silent film The Goddess (神女). That said, a majority of "pheasants" did belong to brothels and would bring their customers back to service them. They were called "pheasants" for their gaudy dress and habit of scouring the streets for customers.
 "Flowers" – Coming from the term "flower-smoke rooms," this and the following were the lowest class of prostitutes. Flower smoke rooms were opium dens where customers could have prostitutes while smoking opium. This class of prostitutes disappeared before the Cultural Revolution Reforms with the ban of opium.
 "Nailsheds" – These brothels were targeted towards low class laborers such as rickshaw pullers.

Historical use of the term
 The concept has been around for 2,000 years as recorded by emperors of the Han Dynasty who needed to provide female entertainment for troop amusement. In ancient China, many terms were given to these entertainers, such as "gē jì", "gē jī", "ōu zhě", etc.
 The English term came from 1911 (see Origin).
 During the 1930s, Li Jinhui started the Chinese popular music industry with a number of musical troupes. The groups were mostly young women performing and singing. The term Sing-Song-Girls stuck, since the Communist Party of China associated pop music as Yellow Music or pornography in the 1940s.

Cultural impact
In Shanghai, Sing-song girls became a unique part of the city's culture, one which, in turn, affected the culture of other parts of China. As Shanghai was divided into different concessions loosely governed by multiple parties, there was greater freedom there for sing-song girls to come into the public eye without legal repercussions. This opened the door, allowing for the entertainment culture of the sing-song girls to impact the more traditional Chinese culture.

While even the highest class Changsan could not escape the ignominy of the sex trade, in some ways, that liberated her to flaunt a provocative culture which conservative Chinese tradition would not allow. Traditional views held that once married, a woman had no need to impress anyone. In conjunction with Confucian ideals of the virtues of modesty, this led to a standard of dress aimed to hide the form of the body within. However, sing-song girls, being unburdened such virtues, unmarried and perpetually courting were free not only to explore high fashion, but also to adapt it to be more. An example of this can be seen in the cheongsam which not only became more form fitting, but also became sleeveless with a long slit running up each side.

In general, the fact that sing-song girls were solely focused on entertainment meant that they were able to push the envelope of culture and style. For instance, they often decorated their parlors with expensive decor and modern amenities, making them culturally progressive to the point where there are documented cases of women sneaking into the entertainment houses to catch a glimpse of what the latest decorations and fashions were. Additionally, the fact that the sing-song girls were often courted by prominent individuals in society gave them further attention, even notoriety. For instance, it was not uncommon for famous sing-song girls to be invited to publicly accompany their courters allowing for them to further flaunt their fashion.

Sing-song girls would also be some of the first individuals in Chinese society to penetrate mass media. For instance, some sing-song girls began to use portraits of themselves as a way to attract business, early business cards. Moreover, the advent of mass advertisement and its use of women to market products resulted in the circulation of images of famous sing-song girls being displayed as the apparent standard of dress and beauty.

In a way, at least in Shanghai, the highest class sing-song girls became the first modern celebrities. Their fame came to them, not because of their virtues and industry, rather because of their association with high culture and the latest fashion. Accordingly, they used that fame to continue stretching the confines placed by conservative culture in ways which popularized modern technology and the expression of feminine sexuality.

Fiction
 Sing-song girls are popularized in the 1892 novel by Han Bangqing called Sing-Song Girls of Shanghai (later adapted into the 1998 film Flowers of Shanghai).
 Sing-song girls play a minor role in Isabel Allende's Daughter of Fortune (Hija de la fortuna). Tao Chi'en dedicates his work to healing sick girls – although most end up dying – because it is when they are sick that he can sneak them out of the house under the pretext of conducting "experiments". He tries to help those girls who manage to recover to improve their lives so that they no longer need to prostitute themselves.
 Allende also mentions sing-song girls in her book Portrait in Sepia (Retrato en Sepia).
 Amitav Ghosh's novel River of Smoke, set in southern Chinese port cities, refers to prostitutes in Canton as "sing-song girls."

See also

 Oiran
 Tawaif, similar profession during colonial India
 Yiji

References

 
History of Shanghai
Courtesans by type